New York City's 49th City Council district is one of 51 districts in the New York City Council. It has been represented by Democrat Kamillah Hanks since 2022. Hanks succeeded former councilwoman Debi Rose, who was term limited in 2021.

Geography
District 49 covers nearly the entire North Shore of Staten Island, including the neighborhoods of Stapleton, West New Brighton, Port Richmond, Sunnyside, St. George, Mariners Harbor, New Brighton, Clifton, Arlington, Graniteville, Livingston, Tompkinsville, Randall Manor, Silver Lake, and parts of Concord and Rosebank. Clove Lakes Park, Sailors' Snug Harbor, and the Staten Island Zoo are also located within the district.

The district overlaps with Staten Island Community Boards 1 and 2, and is contained entirely within New York's 11th congressional district. It also overlaps with the 23rd and 24th districts of the New York State Senate, and with the 61st, 63rd, and 64th districts of the New York State Assembly.

The district is both the most Democratic and the most diverse City Council district on Staten Island, and it is the only one to currently be represented by a Democrat. When Debi Rose was elected in 2009, she was the first African American to ever hold higher office on the island.

Recent election results

2021
In 2019, voters in New York City approved Ballot Question 1, which implemented ranked-choice voting in all local elections. Under the new system, voters have the option to rank up to five candidates for every local office. Voters whose first-choice candidates fare poorly will have their votes redistributed to other candidates in their ranking until one candidate surpasses the 50 percent threshold. If one candidate surpasses 50 percent in first-choice votes, then ranked-choice tabulations will not occur.

2017

2013

References

New York City Council districts